The Swedish Basketball League MVP award is an annual award that is handed out to the most valuable player in the Basketligan dam (SBL), which is the highest tier of professional basketball in the country of Sweden.

Winners

References

Basketball in Sweden
Women's sports